Greece–Uruguay relations are diplomatic relations between Greece and Uruguay. Both nations are members of the World Trade Organization.

History

Uruguay was one of the first countries to recognize the newly established Greek state after the war of independence from the Ottoman Empire in 1821. In 1872, Greece and Uruguay established honorary consulates in each other's countries, respectively. In 1916, the La Colectividad Helénica de Montevideo was established in Montevideo as a cultural center for the Greek community in Uruguay. In the 1920s, the first major wave of Greek immigrants arrived in the country. Diplomatic relations between Greece and Uruguay were officially established in 1928. In the 1950s and 1960s, after the Greek Civil War, Uruguay received a second wave of Greek immigrants to the country.

In March 1978, the Maria Tsakos Foundation was established in Montevideo to teach ancient and modern Hellenic culture and language.

Bilateral agreements
Both nations have signed several bilateral agreements, such as an Agreement on Cultural Cooperation (1967); Agreement on Social Security (1994) and an Agreement on the Reciprocal Abolition of Visas for Diplomatic and Service Passport Holders (1994).

Trade
Greece's main exports to Uruguay include: Papadopoulos biscuits, olive oil and tobacco.
Uruguay's main exports to Greece include: soy, citruses (primarily lemons) and fish. Greek shipping company, Tsakos Energy Navigation, is a major investor in Uruguay with more than US$250 million invested in the country.

Resident diplomatic missions
 Greece has an embassy in Montevideo.
 Uruguay has an embassy in Athens.

See also
 Greek Uruguayans
 Saint Nicholas Greek Orthodox Church, Montevideo

References

External links

  Greek Ministry of Foreign Affairs about the relation with Uruguay
 Greek embassy in Montevideo (in Greek and Spanish only)
Tsakos Foundation in Uruguay (contains the Honorary Consulate of Cyprus and is the official Greek Institute in Uruguay)
Tsakos Industrias Navales SA

 
Uruguay
Greece